The Gliwice Canal is a canal connecting the Oder (Odra) River to the city of Gliwice in the Silesian Voivodeship (Upper Silesian Industrial Region), Poland. Also known as the Upper Silesian Canal (Kanał Górnośląski, Oberschlesischer Kanal), it was built from 1935 to 1939 and replaced the Kłodnicki Canal.

Structure
The canal starts at the port of Gliwice and descends to Kędzierzyn-Koźle on the Oder. The canal passes through Opole Voivodeship and Silesian Voivodeship in Poland.

It has six locks. The canal is accessible from 15 March to 15 December (270 days a year).

Locks:
 in Łabędy district of Gliwice
 in Dzierżno district of Pyskowice
 in Rudziniec village
 in Sławięcice district of Kędzierzyn-Koźle
 in Nowa Wieś village
 in Kłodnica district of Kędzierzyn-Koźle

The water in the canal comes from the Kłodnica River as well as lakes and reservoirs such as Dzierżno Duże and Dzierżno Małe.

History
The Gliwice Canal was originally built in the Province of Upper Silesia within Germany. Because the Klodnitz (Kłodnicki) Canal had become obsolete, it was decided in 1934 that construction of a new canal was more feasible than modernization of the older Klodnitz Canal, which closed in 1937. The new canal, known as the Gleiwitz Canal, was built from 1935-1939 and opened for service in 1941. On 8 December 1939, it was renamed the Adolf Hitler Canal (Adolf-Hitler-Kanal), in honor of Adolf Hitler, during the inauguration ceremony by Rudolf Hess. There were also plans to make it a part of the Danube-Oder-Canal project. After World War II, the canal and the surrounding territories (see Regained Territories) were placed under Polish administration according to the 1945 Potsdam Conference.

About fifty people are employed in maintaining the canal. About 700 000 tonnes of material are shipped each year through the canal (mostly coal). The Polish government is considering modernizing the canal.

References

External links
Kanał Gliwicki on official pages of RZGW Gliwice 
Kanał Gliwicki - serwis informacyjny 
Barką do Kędzierzyna - Kanał Gliwicki 

Buildings and structures completed in 1939
Canals in Poland
Canal
Canals opened in 1941